Eileen Moreno Estrada (born 5 December 1984) is a Colombian television actress best known in her native country for her roles in Colombian telenovelas. Moreno was born in Palmira, Valle del Cauca, Colombia, and her most prominent television roles have been in La viuda negra as Griselda Blanco, in her youth stage, and Mariana Durán in the biographical drama series El Chivo, both series generally produced by RTI Producciones. 

Moreno currently resides in Bogotá, Colombia and she is the founder and director of the Todas Unidas foundation. She has only participated in cinema in the film Operation E, a film based on the humanitarian operation called Operation Emmanuel, directed by former Venezuelan President Hugo Chávez, and former Colombian President Álvaro Uribe.

Filmography

References

External links 
 

1984 births
Living people
Colombian telenovela actresses
Colombian television actresses
21st-century Colombian actresses
People from Palmira, Valle del Cauca
People from Bogotá
Violence against women in Colombia